John Willis Clark (1833 – 1910), sometimes J. W. Clark, was an English academic and antiquarian.

Academic career
Clark was born into a Cambridge University academic family, and was a nephew of Prof. Robert Willis. Educated at Eton and Trinity College, Cambridge, he spent his life at the university, serving as Fellow of Trinity, Superintendent of the Cambridge University Museum of Zoology from 1866 to 1892, and Registrary of the university. He was also Secretary of the Cambridge Antiquarian Society.

He received the honorary degree Doctor of Letters (D.Litt.) from the University of Oxford in October 1902, in connection with the tercentenary of the Bodleian Library.

Clark died in 1910, and is buried in the Mill Road cemetery, Cambridge.

His son was Sir William Henry Clark.

Works

 Architectural History of the University and Colleges of Cambridge, with Robert Willis, 4 volumes, 1886.
 The Life and Letters of The Reverend Adam Sedgwick (1890) in 2 volumes
 Libraries in the Medieval and Renaissance Periods (1894)
 The observances in use at The Augustinian Priory of S. Giles : and S. Andrew at Barnwell, Cambridgeshire (1897)
 On the Vatican Library of Sixtus IV (1899)
 A descriptive catalogue of the manuscripts in the library of Peterhouse (1899)
 Old friends at Cambridge and elsewhere (1900)
 The Care of Books (1901)
 Cambridge; a concise guide to the town & university in an introduction and four walks (2nd edition, 1902); (1st edition, 1898) 
 Endowments of the University of Cambridge (1904)
 Cambridge (1908)

Contributions to the DNB
James Burrough
William Clark
Nicholas Close
John Dawson (surgeon) (1734–1820)
Philip Douglas
James Essex
Richard Harraden
Joseph Jowett
David Loggan
Henry Richards Luard
Isaac Milner
John Montagu (Trinity) (1655?–1728)
George Peacock (1791–1858)
George Phillips (canon lawyer) (1804–1892)
Robert Plumptre
Thomas Postlethwaite
Joseph Power
George Pryme
Connop Thirlwall
William Hepworth Thompson
Francis Willis
Robert Willis (engineer) (1800–1875)
Francis John Hyde Wollaston
Christopher Wordsworth (1774–1846)

Works about Clark

References 

 Arthur Shipley, "J": a Memoir of John Willis Clark, 1913.
 
  John Willis Clark and The Care of Books at the Fitzwilliam Museum
 Clark, John Willis. (1904). Endowments of the University of Cambridge. Cambridge University Press (reissued by Cambridge University Press, 2009)
 Clark, John Willis. (1902). The Care of Books. Cambridge University Press (reissued by Cambridge University Press, 2009)
 Clark, John Willis. (1901). Specimens of Printing Types and Ornaments. Cambridge University Press (reissued by Cambridge University Press, 2009)

External links

 
 
 

People educated at Eton College
Fellows of Trinity College, Cambridge
English antiquarians
1833 births
1910 deaths
Registraries of the University of Cambridge